Insurify is an American insurance comparison shopping website headquartered in Cambridge, Massachusetts. Partnering with insurance companies like Nationwide, Farmers, and Liberty Mutual, Insurify is licensed and operating in all 50 states. The platform has collected more than 100,000 reviews from customers.

History 
Insurify was founded in 2013 by Snejina Zacharia, MIT Sloan fellow and Giorgos Zacharia, President of Kayak.com metasearch engine and Tod Kiryazov, CPO, MBA.

In January 2015, company secured $2M of funding in a seed round led by Rationalwave Capital Partners and other angel investors. The funding was used to officially launch its marketplace website.

Insurify started offering its online insurance quote comparison marketplace publicly in July 2015 in Texas, California, and Florida. The company established relationships with auto insurance carriers and auto insurance brokers that allowed them to provide personalized insurance quotes based on a user's profile, vehicle, and driving history. By January 2016, Insurify had expanded coverage to 30 states. The website lets users type in their zip code, answer questions about their car(s) and driving record and compare auto insurance quotes from major insurance carriers including Liberty Mutual, Metlife, The Travelers Companies, Safeco, The General and Nationwide Mutual Insurance Company. Insurify is officially accredited and operates in all 50 states.

In October 2016, Insurify raised $4.6M of funding in a seed round, led by MassMutual Ventures and Nationwide Ventures and also launched a Facebook Messenger chat bot, which allows users to compare and buy insurance directly from Facebook Messenger.

In January 2020, Insurify announced it raised $23M in Series A funding, led by MTech Capital and Viola FinTech, with support from Hearst Ventures, MassMutual Ventures, and Nationwide.

Operations
Insurify is an auto and home insurance comparison insurance website that uses predictive modeling in order to make shopping for car insurance easier. Insurify is the operator of Evia (Expert Virtual Insurance Agent), which allows users to search for car insurance by texting a photo of their license plate. The company invented RateRank, a proprietary software that matches each driver's profile and risk levels to the best insurance carrier and coverage.

References

Financial services companies of the United States
Financial services companies established in 2013
Internet properties established in 2013
Comparison shopping websites
Companies based in Cambridge, Massachusetts